The Hearne Craton is a craton in northern Canada which, together with the Rae Craton, forms the Western Churchill Province.  Hearne is one of the six Archaean cratons of the Canadian Shield (the other being Slave, Rae, Wyoming, Superior, Nain) that are bound together by Palaeoproterozoic orogenic belts.  Before being merged these six cratons formed independent microcontinents.

Geological setting
The Hearne Craton is separated from the Rae Craton by the -long Snowbird Tectonic Zone (STZ). During the Neoarchaean and Palaeoproterozoic the STZ played a major role when the Western Churchill Province was first assembled and then reworked. The STZ is a record of Neoarchaean plate tectonics similar in scale to modern orogenic belts.

When Laurentia formed at 2.0–1.7 Ga Hearne and Rae formed a central strip to which the Slave, Superior, Sask, and Wyoming cratons were accreted. This strip is bounded by a series of orogens: the 1.92–1.69 Ga Trans-Hudson to the south, the 2.0–1.9 Ga Taltson–Thelon and the 1.97–1.84 Ga Wopmey to the west. Hearne and Rae were extensively reworked during the assembly of Laurentia and overlain by Palaeoproterozoic cover sequences. On Hearne the most extensive such cover sequence is a series of continental and marine deposits known as the Hurwitz Group, a series of north-east-trending belts that cover . In the south-western Hearne continental siliciclastic rocks known as the Kiyuk Group overlie the Hurwitz Group. Both groups are covered by a thick cover of thrusts and folds.

Manikewan Ocean
Intra-oceanic arc collision resulted in the Amisk Collage and the Flin Flon – Glennie Complex around 1.92–1.88 Ga. Today these Palaeoproterzoic structures in the Trans-Hudson Orogen welds the Archaean Hearne and the Superior cratons. As the ocean continued to close, an Andean-style arc pluton known as the Wathaman Batholith formed 1.86–1.85 Ga. The subduction of the Manikewan Ocean stopped when the La Ronge Arc collided with Hearne. The final closure of the ocean around 1.83 Ga, when Hearne, Superior, and Sask cratons merged with the Flin Flon – Glennie Complex, was followed by a period of metamorphism that peaked around 1.82–1.8 Ga. The Manikewan Mobile Belt now covers an area of  but is overlain by Middle Proterozoic Athabasca sandstone.

References

Notes

Sources

 
 
 
 
 
 

Cratons
Historical geology
Geology of North America